La Blanca is a census-designated place (CDP) in Hidalgo County, Texas. The population was 2,488 at the 2010 United States Census. It is part of the McAllen–Edinburg–Mission Metropolitan Statistical Area.

Geography
La Blanca is located at State Hwy 107 and Farm Rd 493, eight miles east of Edinburg and 10 miles north of Donna (26.308188, -98.030491).

Demographics
As of the census of 2000, there were 2,351 people, 548 households, and 522 families residing in the CDP. The population density was 566.5 people per square mile (218.7/km2). There were 589 housing units at an average density of 141.9/sq mi (54.8/km2). The racial makeup of the CDP was 73.54% White, 1.11% Native American, 0.17% Asian, 24.12% from other races, and 1.06% from two or more races. Hispanic or Latino of any race were 97.36% of the population.

There were 548 households, out of which 66.8% had children under the age of 18 living with them, 78.1% were married couples living together, 14.4% had a female householder with no husband present, and 4.7% were non-families. 3.8% of all households were made up of individuals, and 1.5% had someone living alone who was 65 years of age or older. The average household size was 4.29 and the average family size was 4.41.

In the CDP, the population was spread out, with 40.7% under the age of 18, 11.8% from 18 to 24, 29.0% from 25 to 44, 14.2% from 45 to 64, and 4.2% who were 65 years of age or older. The median age was 23 years. For every 100 females, there were 94.1 males. For every 100 females age 18 and over, there were 89.8 males.

The median income for a household in the CDP was $21,688, and the median income for a family was $22,063. Males had a median income of $17,841 versus $11,846 for females. The per capita income for the CDP was $6,421. About 35.3% of families and 38.6% of the population were below the poverty line, including 38.3% of those under age 18 and 41.4% of those age 65 or over.

Education
The city is served by the Edinburg Consolidated Independent School District (ECISD).

Schools serving La Blanca include John F. Kennedy Elementary School (grades PK-5), Harwell Middle School(6-8), and Economedes High School (9-12).

In addition, La Blanca residents are allowed to apply to magnet schools operated by the South Texas Independent School District.

All of Hidalgo County is in the service area of South Texas College.

References

Census-designated places in Hidalgo County, Texas
Census-designated places in Texas